What Happened to Father? is a 1927 American silent comedy film directed by John G. Adolfi and written by Charles R. Condon. It is based on the 1909 short story of the same name by Mary Roberts Rinehart that was originally serialized in Lippincott's Monthly Magazine . The film stars Warner Oland, Flobelle Fairbanks, and William Demarest. A previous version of the story was filmed in 1915.

The film was released on June 25, 1927 by Warner Bros. Pictures.

Cast
Warner Oland as W. Bradberry, Father 
Flobelle Fairbanks as Betty Bradberry
William Demarest as Dibbin
Vera Lewis as Mrs. Bradberry
John Miljan as Victor Smith
Hugh Allan as Tommy Dawson
Cathleen Calhoun as Violet 
Jean Lefferty as Gloria

Preservation
The film is now considered lost.

References

External links

1927 films
American silent feature films
Lost American films
Warner Bros. films
1927 comedy films
Silent American comedy films
American black-and-white films
Films based on works by Mary Roberts Rinehart
Films directed by John G. Adolfi
Remakes of American films
1927 lost films
Lost comedy films
1920s American films
1920s English-language films